In experimental physics, researchers have proposed non-extensive self-consistent thermodynamic theory to describe phenomena observed in the Large Hadron Collider (LHC).  This theory investigates a fireball for high-energy particle collisions, while using Tsallis non-extensive thermodynamics. Fireballs lead to the bootstrap idea, or self-consistency principle, just as in the Boltzmann statistics used by Rolf Hagedorn. Assuming the distribution function gets variations, due to possible symmetrical change, Abdel Nasser Tawfik applied the non-extensive concepts of high-energy particle production.

The motivation to use the non-extensive statistics from Tsallis comes from the results obtained by Bediaga et al. They showed that with the substitution of the Boltzmann factor in Hagedorn's theory by the q-exponential function, it was possible to recover good agreement between calculation and experiment, even at energies as high as those achieved at the LHC, with q>1.

Non-extensive entropy for ideal quantum gas

That group and also Clemens and Worku, the entropy just defined leads to occupation number formulas that reduce to Bediaga's. C. Beck, shows the power-like tails present in the distributions found in high energy physics experiments.

Non-extensive partition function for ideal quantum gas 
Using the entropy defined above, the partition function results are

Since experiments have shown that , this restriction is adopted.

Another way to write the non-extensive partition function for a fireball is

where  is the density of states of the fireballs.

Self-consistency principle
Self-consistency implies that both forms of partition functions must be asymptotically equivalent and that the mass spectrum and the density of states must be related to each other by
,
in the limit of  sufficiently large.

The self-consistency can be asymptotically achieved by choosing

and

Here,  are arbitrary constants. For  the two expressions above approach the corresponding expressions in Hagedorn's theory.

Main results
With the mass spectrum and density of states given above, the asymptotic form of the partition function is

where

with

One immediate consequence of the expression for the partition function is the existence of a limiting temperature . This result is equivalent to Hagedorn's result. With these results, it is expected that at sufficiently high energy, the fireball presents a constant temperature and constant entropic factor.

The connection between Hagedorn's theory and Tsallis statistics has been established through the concept of thermofractals, where it is shown that non extensivity can emerge from a fractal structure. This result is interesting because Hagedorn's definition of fireball characterizes it as a fractal.

Experimental evidence

Experimental evidence of the existence of a limiting temperature and of a limiting entropic index can be found in J. Cleymans and collaborators, and by I. Sena and A. Deppman.

See also
 Self-consistency principle in high energy physics

References

Experimental particle physics
Nuclear physics
Principles